Taintrux is a village and commune in the Vosges department in Grand Est in northeastern France.

Geography

The village lies at the foot of the Pierre de Laitre, a sandstone butte.
The river Mortagne forms all of the commune's southwestern border.

See also
 Communes of the Vosges department

References

Communes of Vosges (department)